Augusta Bay may refer to:

Augusta Bay, Sicily, Italy
Empress Augusta Bay, Bahamas
Augusta Bay, Nordaustlandet, Svalbard, Norway
Augusta Bay, Nunavut, Canada